Limburg Province may refer to:
Limburg (Belgium)
Limburg (Netherlands)
Province of Limburg (1815–1839), a former province of the United Kingdom of the Netherlands

Province name disambiguation pages